Populai Island (also known as Margaret Island) is an island in the Louisiade Archipelago in Milne Bay Province, Papua New Guinea.

Administration 
The island is part of Gotai Ward. it belongs to Bwanabwana Rural Local Level Government Area LLG, Samarai-Murua District, which are in Milne Bay Province.

Geography 
Populai is located Southeast of Sideia Island. 
The island is part of the Sideia group, itself a part of Samarai Islands of the Louisiade Archipelago.

Demographics 
The population of 15 is living in 1 village on the north coast.

References

Islands of Milne Bay Province
Louisiade Archipelago